was the 65th emperor of Japan, according to the traditional order of succession.

Kazan's reign spanned the years from 984 through 986.

Biography
Before his ascension to the Chrysanthemum Throne, his personal name (imina) was Morosada-shinnō (師貞親王).

Morasada was the eldest son of Emperor Reizei. The prince's mother was Fujiwara no Kaneko/Kaishi (藤原懐子), who was a daughter of sesshō Fujiwara no Koretada. Morasada was also the brother of Emperor Sanjō.

Events of Kazan's life

Prince Morasada was seventeen years of age at the time of the succession.

 October 6, 984 (Eikan 1, 27th day of the 8th month): In the 15th year of Emperor En'yu's reign (円融天皇十五年), he abdicated; and the succession (senso) was received by a nephew.  Shortly thereafter, Emperor Kazan is said to have acceded to the throne (sokui).

He commissioned the Shūi Wakashū.

 985 (Kanna 1, 4th month): Fujiwara no Tokiakira and his brother, Yasusuke, contended with Fujiwara no Sukitaka and Ōe-no Masahira in a sword fight in Kyoto. Masahira lost the fingers of his left hand.  The two brothers fled; and after careful searching, Tokiakira was eventually located in Ōmi Province.

He faced a tough political struggle from the Fujiwara family; and at the age of nineteen, he was manipulated into abandoning the throne by Fujiwara no Kaneie. Kaneie told him that Ichijo (Kaneie's maternal grandson) already held the Regalia, and that there was no purpose in Kazan continuing to rule. Under some pressure, Kazan acquiesced, and went to the Gangō-ji monastery. He was accompanied by Kaneie's second son,  Michikane, who was also to enter religion. When they arrived, however, Michikane said he would like to see his parents one final time while he was still a layman. Michikane never came back.

 986 (Kanna 2, 6th month): Kazan abdicated, and took up residence at Gangō-ji where he became a Buddhist monk; and his new priestly name was Nyūkaku.
 August 23, 986 (Kanna 2, 16th day of the 7th month): Iyasada-shinnō was appointed as heir and crown prince at age 11.  This followed the convention that two imperial lineages took the throne in turn, although Emperor Ichijō was in fact Iyasada's junior. He thus gained the nickname Sakasa-no moke-no kimi (the imperial heir in reverse). When Emperor Kanzan abandoned the world for holy orders, one grandson of Kaneie ascended to the throne as Emperor Ichijō (the 66th sovereign); and in due course, another grandson would follow on the throne as Emperor Sanjō (the 67th sovereign).

Nyūkaku went on various pilgrimages and 're-founded' the Kannon pilgrimage, as a monk to the name of Tokudo Shonin (Some scholars doubt that Kazan, in his unstable mental condition at the time was involved with the founding of the pilgrimage, thereby leaving all of the credit to Shonin) had supposedly already created it. This pilgrimage involved travelling to 33 locations across the eight provinces of the Bando area.

He was told to visit these 33 sites, in order to bring release from suffering, by Kannon Bosatsu in a vision.

It is said that the first site of the pilgrimage was the Sugimoto-dera in Kamakura. This site is also the first site on the Kamakura pilgrimage.

It is suggested by many scholars that the mental health of Kazan, particularly in later life, was not stable; and therefore, living as a monk may have caused deteriorating behavior.

Daijō-tennō Kazan died at the age of 41 on the 8th day of the 2nd month of the fifth year of Kankō (1008).

The actual site of Kazan's grave is known.  This emperor is traditionally venerated at a memorial Shinto shrine (misasagi) at Kyoto.

The Imperial Household Agency designates this location as Kazan's mausoleum.  It is formally named Kamiya no hotori no misasagi.

He is buried amongst the "Seven Imperial Tombs" at Ryōan-ji Temple in Kyoto. The mound which commemorates the Hosokawa Emperor Kazan is today named Kinugasa-yama.  The emperor's burial place would have been quite humble in the period after Kazan died.  These tombs reached their present state as a result of the 19th century restoration of imperial sepulchers (misasagi) which were ordered by Emperor Meiji.

Kugyō
 is a collective term for the very few most powerful men attached to the court of the Emperor of Japan in pre-Meiji eras.

In general, this elite group included only three to four men at a time.  These were hereditary courtiers whose experience and background have brought them to the pinnacle of a life's career.  During Kazan's reign, this apex of the Daijō-kan included: 
 Kampaku, Fujiwara no Yoritada, 924–989.
 Daijō-daijin, Fujiwara no Yoritada.
 Sadaijin, Fujiwara no Kaneie, 929–990.
 Naidaijin (not appointed)
 Dainagon

Eras of Kazan's reign
The years of Kazan's reign are more specifically identified by more than one era name or nengō.
 Eikan   (983–985)
 Kanna   (985–986)

Consorts and children
Consort (Nyōgo): Fujiwara no Shishi (藤原忯子; 969–985), Fujiwara no Tamemitsu’s daughter

Consort (Nyōgo): Fujiwara no Teishi (藤原諟子; d.1035), Fujiwara no Yoritada’s daughter

Consort (Nyōgo): Fujiwara no Chōshi (藤原姚子; 971–989), Fujiwara no Asateru's daughter

Consort (Nyōgo): Princess Enshi (婉子女王; 972-998), Imperial Prince Tamehira's daughter

Nakatsukasa (中務), Taira no Sukeyuki's daughter,  – Nurse of Emperor Kazan
Imperial Prince Kiyohito (清仁親王; ca. 998–1030) – Ancestor of Shirakawa family (白川家)
princess (d.1024), Fujiwara no Shoshi’s lady-in-waiting
princess 

Nakatsukasa (中務), Taira no Heishi (平平子), Taira no Suketada's daughter 
Imperial Prince Akinori (昭登親王; 998–1035)
princess
princess

(from unknown women)
Kakugen (覚源; 1000–1065), a Buddhist monk (Gon-no-Sōjō, 権僧正)
Shinkan (深観; 1001–1050), a Buddhist monk (Gon-no-Daisōzu, 権大僧都)

Ancestry

Notes

References
 Brown, Delmer M. and Ichirō Ishida, eds. (1979).  Gukanshō: The Future and the Past. Berkeley: University of California Press. ;  
 Moscher, Gouverneur. (1978). Kyoto: A Contemplative Guide. ;  
 Ponsonby-Fane, Richard Arthur Brabazon. (1959).  The Imperial House of Japan. Kyoto: Ponsonby Memorial Society. 
 Titsingh, Isaac. (1834). Nihon Odai Ichiran; ou,  Annales des empereurs du Japon.  Paris: Royal Asiatic Society, Oriental Translation Fund of Great Britain and Ireland.  
 Varley, H. Paul. (1980). Jinnō Shōtōki: A Chronicle of Gods and Sovereigns. New York: Columbia University Press. ;

See also
 Emperor of Japan
 List of Emperors of Japan
 Imperial cult

 
 

Japanese emperors
968 births
1008 deaths
People of Heian-period Japan
Heian period Buddhist clergy
10th-century Japanese monarchs
11th-century Japanese people
Japanese Buddhist monarchs
Japanese retired emperors
People from Kyoto